Lookout Games is a German board and card game publisher. The company published, among other games, the board game Agricola, which was honored with the Complex Game award by the German Game of the Year jury in 2008.

History
The company was founded in 2000 by Hanno Girke, Uwe Rosenberg and Marcel-André Casasola Merkle. By this time, especially Rosenberg was already well known for his card game Bohnanza, which was published by a major German game company. The first game of Lookout Games was a small card game called Attribut. The game was originally published online at the gaming website Brettspielwelt. Later, the company started to produce physical copies of the game. In 2003 Attribut was on the shortlist for the German Game of the Year award. In 2007 the board game Agricola was published. In 2008 Agricola got the special award Complex Game at the German Game of the Year awards and the first place at the German Game Prize. Agricola became one of the highest rated games at the board game website Boardgamegeek. 2008 the successor Le Havre was published. In 2009 Le Havre got the second place at the German Game Prize. In 2005 the company started to publish games from Z-Man Games in Germany.

Published games

Own games

 2002: Attribut, Game of the Year Awards shortlist
 2004:
 Attribut 2
 Schätzbold
 The Scepter of Zavandor
 2005: Spelunke
 2006:
 Die Drachenbändiger von Zavandor

 2007: Agricola, Special Award: Complex Game 2008, German Game Prize 2008
 2008: Le Havre, German Game Prize - Second Place 2009
 2009: Automobile
 2010:
 Merkator
 The Mines of Zavandor
 various Bohnanza expansions
 various Agricola expansions
 2013 Caverna
 2014 Murano
 2015 Isle of Skye: From Chieftain to King
 2020 Hallertau

Games by other companies

Games by Z-Man Games, which Lookout Games published in Germany:

 2005: The End of the Triumvirate
 2009: 

Games by Hartland Trefoil Ltd, which Lookout Games published in Germany:

 2009: 1853

References

External links
Lookout Games website 

Board game publishing companies
Card game publishing companies
Companies based in Rhineland-Palatinate
Publishing companies established in 2000